Jeff Dotseth is an American politician serving in the Minnesota House of Representatives since 2023. A member of the Republican Party of Minnesota, Dotseth represents District 11A in northeastern Minnesota, which includes the city of Cloquet, Thomson Township, and parts of Carlton, Pine and St. Louis Counies.

Minnesota House of Representatives 
Dotseth was first elected to the Minnesota House of Representatives in 2022, after redistricting and the retirement of DFL incumbent Mike Sundin. Dotseth serves on the Commerce Finance and Policy and Housing Finance and Policy Committees.

Electoral history

Personal life 
Dotseth lives in Kettle River, Minnesota with his wife, Melissa, and three children.

References

External links 

Members of the Minnesota House of Representatives

Living people
Year of birth missing (living people)